Life Has Ended Here is the second album by Dominion III. It features a more prominent industrial edge and guitar-driven tracks. The style continues to be characterized by hard and aggressive rhythms combined with hopeless and sinister soundscapes.

Track listing
 "A Dead Heart in a Dead World"
 "Life Has Ended Here"
 "The Priests of Emptiness"
 "Conductors of Life"
 "Unreal"
 "Code Red"
 "Coming Winter"

Credits
 Tharen – Vocals, all music and lyrics
 Elisabeth Toriser – Vocals on tracks 1, 2, 3
 Jörg Lanz – Guitar and Bass on tracks 3, 5, 7

Additional guitars on track 5 & additional vocals on track 4 by Tomas Pure. 
Recorded, mixed and mastered at Pure Sound Recordings in 2002. 
Audio engineering by Tomas Pure.  Layout photography by Spoonman.  All design and layout by Tharen.

References

2002 albums
Dominion III albums
Napalm Records albums